Yusuf Soalih also called Afa Ajura (1890-2004), was a Ghanaian Islamic scholar, a preacher, political activist, and the founder and leader of a sect in Ghana. Afa Ajura was a proponent of Sunni Islam shunning pre-Islamic pagan practices, and whom some have referred to as a precursor to Wahhabi reformism in Ghana. He established the Anbariyya Islamic Institute in Tamale in the 1940s. He died in Tamale on December 22, 2004. He was succeeded by Saeed Abubakr Zakaria in 2007 as leader of the Anbariyya Sunni Community.

See also 

 Moulvi Abdul Wahab Adam
 Yaa-Naa Yakubu Andani II

References

Further reading

External links 
 Ahlussunna Wal Jama’a (ASWAJ)
 Anbariya Sunni Community

Year of birth uncertain
2004 deaths
Ghanaian imams
Ghanaian Muslims
Ghanaian theologians
Yusuf, Soalih Ajura
Sunni Muslim scholars of Islam
1890 births